The Bravo is an oil painting usually attributed to Titian, dated to around 1516-17 and now in the Kunsthistorisches Museum in Vienna.  The painting can be seen as one of a number of Venetian paintings of the 1510s showing two or three half-length figures with heads close together, often with their expressions and interactions enigmatic. Most of these are "Giorgionesque" genre or tronie subjects where the subjects are anonymous, though the group includes Titian's The Tribute Money, with Christ as the main figure, which in terms of style is similar to this painting, and his Lucretia and her Husband, also in Vienna, where at least the woman's identity is clear, if not that of the man.

Alternative attributions are to Giorgione (in the past) and Palma Vecchio.

Description
Against a dark background two male figures are shown, one in front of the other, with the rear one looking over his shoulder at a foreground figure who is tapping his shoulder, making him turn sharply. This foreground figure is dressed in armour and his other hand hides a dagger or a sword of which we see only the hilt, suggesting an attack is imminent. The rear figure is a young man with flowing blonde hair, wearing a garland of vine leaves on his head, who has also reached for his weapon, the hilt dimly visible at bottom centre. The foreground figure has his head turned away from the viewer.

Various attempts have been made to assign the scene to a specific incident in myth or history.  One suggestion is the arrest of Bacchus's follower Acoetes by Pentheus, king of Thebes, which would explain the wreath of vine-leaves in his hair.  An x-ray of the painting showed that the head of the man on the right (the foreground figure) once wore a crown.

History and attribution
The painting was probably in the Venetian collection of Zuanantonio Venier in 1526, who had one then described as "two half-figures attacking each other by Titian".  In 1636 it was sold to the Duke of Hamilton, who brought it to London.  Most of his purchases were from the collection of Bartolomeo della Nave, who perhaps had it by then. After Hamilton's execution, it was acquired by Archduke Leopold Wilhelm of Austria, whose collection later became part of the Habsburg imperial collection in Vienna, then passed to the Kunsthistorisches Museum. 

An etching after a reduced copy by David Teniers the Younger shows the painting attributed to Giorgione. The painting must have been a popular painting when it was in the Archduke's cabinet, as it was portrayed in some of his gallery paintings by Teniers.

The work was attributed to Titian by the Italian art historian Roberto Longhi, which remains usual. But for  John Steer the painting was "surely by" Palma Vecchio.

Notes

References
 Jaffé, David (ed), Titian, The National Gallery Company/Yale, London 2003, #12 in catalogue
 Steer, John, Venetian painting: A concise history, 1970, London: Thames and Hudson (World of Art), 
 
A period copy in the V&A

1516 paintings
Genre paintings by Titian
Paintings in the collection of the Kunsthistorisches Museum
Paintings in the collection of the Archduke Leopold Wilhelm of Austria